The following is a list of notable deaths in October 2022.

Entries for each day are listed alphabetically by surname. A typical entry lists information in the following sequence:
 Name, age, country of citizenship at birth, subsequent country of citizenship (if applicable), reason for notability, cause of death (if known), and reference.

October 2022

1
Colin Alevras, 51, American restaurateur.
Marguerite Andersen, 97, German-born Canadian writer, poet, and educator.
Kodiyeri Balakrishnan, 68, Indian politician, Kerala MLA (1982–1991, 2001–2016), pancreatic cancer.
Beryl Benacerraf, 73, American radiologist, cancer.
John Bloomfield, 89, Australian sports executive and scientist.
William G. Borchert, 89, American screenwriter (My Name Is Bill W.).
John Boxtel, 92, Dutch-Canadian sculptor and art teacher.
Àngel Casas, 76, Spanish journalist, television talk show host and writer, calciphylaxis.
Kurt Fenske, 92, German economist and politician, member of the Volkskammer (1967–1990).
Al Hoagland, 96, American computer engineer.
Antonio Inoki, 79, Japanese Hall of Fame professional wrestler (NJPW), wrestling promoter, and politician, MP (1989–1995, 2013–2019), amyloidosis.
Toab Khan, 88, Bangladeshi journalist (Janakantha).
Stamatis Kokotas, 85, Greek singer.
Lorry I. Lokey, 95, American businessman and philanthropist, founder of Business Wire.
Rosetta Loy, 91, Italian writer, cardiac arrest.
David O'Connor, 84, Australian-American Egyptologist.
Lech Krzysztof Paprzycki, 75, Polish lawyer and politician, MP (1989–1991), acting first president of the Supreme Court (2014).
Richard Pollock, 87, English linguist and translator.
Raymond Strother, 81, American political consultant.
Jim Sweeney, 60, American football player (New York Jets, Pittsburgh Steelers, Seattle Seahawks) and coach.
Tulsi Tanti, 64, Indian renewable energy executive, founder of Suzlon, cardiac arrest.
Kay Zinck, 61, Canadian curler.

2
Raymond Allen, 82, British television screenwriter (Some Mothers Do 'Ave 'Em, Comedy Playhouse, The Little and Large Show) and playwright, cancer.
Tyrone Davis, 50, American football player (Green Bay Packers, New York Jets).
Darshan Dharmaraj, 41, Sri Lankan actor (Prabhakaran, Ini Avan, Address Na), heart attack.
Bjarne Mørk Eidem, 85, Norwegian politician, MP (1969–1993), minister of fisheries (1986–1989) and auditor general (1990–2005).
Shirley Englehorn, 81, American golfer.
Pietro Fabris, 87, Italian politician, senator (1987–1996).
Wolfgang Haken, 94, German-American mathematician.
Paul Harriss, 68, Australian politician, Tasmanian MHA (2014–2016) and MLC (1996–2014).
Éder Jofre, 86, Brazilian Hall of Fame boxer, world bantamweight (1960–1965) and WBC featherweight (1973–1974) champion, complications from pneumonia.
Jeff Jordan, 78, American football player (Minnesota Vikings).
Douglas Kirkland, 88, Canadian-American photographer.
Vladimir Kuts, 94, Russian World War II veteran.
Sacheen Littlefeather, 75, American civil rights activist and actress (Johnny Firecloud, Winterhawk, Counselor at Crime), breast cancer.
Jean-Pierre Machelon, 77, French academic and jurist.
Eamonn McCabe, 74, British photographer.
Mary McCaslin, 75, American folk singer-songwriter, progressive supranuclear palsy.
Dennis Nyback, 69, American independent film archivist and filmmaker, cancer.
Allan Porter, 88, American-Swiss photographer and magazine editor (Camera).
Atlas Ramachandran, 80, Indian jeweller, film producer (Vaisali, Sukrutham) and actor.
François Remetter, 94, French footballer (Strasbourg, Metz, national team).
Larry Sather, 81, American politician, member of the Pennsylvania House of Representatives (1993–2006).
Annie Shekhar, 84, Indian politician, Maharashtra MLA (2004–2014).
John Shinners, 75, American football player (Cincinnati Bengals, New Orleans Saints, Baltimore Colts).
Laurence Silberman, 86, American jurist, judge of the U.S. Court of Appeals for the District of Columbia (since 1985).
André Sinédo, 44, New Caledonian footballer (AS Magenta, national team).
Béla Szakcsi Lakatos, 79, Hungarian pianist and composer.
Carl Walker, 88, British police inspector.
Bill Whitaker, 63, American football player (Green Bay Packers, St. Louis Cardinals).
Camille Ziade, 79, Lebanese politician, MP (1992–2000).

3
Aïda Ba, 39, French rugby union player (national team), breast cancer.
Ekow Blankson, 50, Ghanaian actor (Checkmate, Sun City).
Per Bredesen, 91, Norwegian footballer (Lazio, Ørn Horten, national team).
Bill Brewster, 80, American politician, member of the U.S. House of Representatives (1991–1997) and Oklahoma House of Representatives (1983–1990).
Nancy B. Firestone, 70, American jurist, judge of the U.S. Court of Federal Claims (since 1998).
Peter Forman, 88, English cricketer (Nottinghamshire).
Ron Franz, 76, American basketball player (Oakland Oaks, New Orleans Buccaneers, The Floridians).
Charles Fuller, 83, American playwright (A Soldier's Play, Zooman and the Sign), Pulitzer winner (1982).
Rebecca Godfrey, 54, Canadian novelist and non-fiction writer, lung cancer.
Simon Hallenbarter, 43, Swiss Olympic biathlete (2006, 2010), suicide.
Ian Hamilton, 97, Scottish lawyer and independence activist (1950 removal of the Stone of Scone).
David Huerta, 72, Mexican poet.
Tiffany Jackson, 37, American basketball player (New York Liberty, Tulsa Shock, Los Angeles Sparks) and coach, cancer.
Kim Jung Gi, 47, South Korean illustrator and comics artist, heart attack.
Johann Müllner, 90, Austrian farmer and politician.
Al Neiger, 83, American baseball player (Philadelphia Phillies).
Jesús Quintero, 82, Spanish journalist, respiratory failure.
Pandurang Raut, 76, Indian politician, Goa MLA (1989–1994, 1999–2002).
Fabián Ríos, 58, Argentine politician, senator (2003–2009) and deputy (2011–2013), heart failure.
George Saurman, 96, American politician, member of the Pennsylvania House of Representatives (1981–1994).
Léonie Sazias, 65, Dutch television presenter and politician, MP (2017–2021), colon cancer.
Nicolas Tikhobrazoff, 76, French painter and radio host.
Howard Tripp, 95, British Roman Catholic prelate, titular bishop of Newport and auxiliary bishop of Southwark (1980–2004).
Jerzy Urban, 89, Polish journalist (Polityka, Nie) and writer.
Wang Hongfan, 89, Chinese politician, member of the National People's Congress (1993–1998).
Florin Zalomir, 41, Romanian fencer, Olympic silver medallist (2012).

4
Philippe Ascher, 86, French neuroscientist.
Walter Dean Burnham, 92, American political scientist and author (Presidential Ballots, 1836–1892).
Viktor Donskikh, 87, Russian politician, deputy (1991–1993).
Dave Dryden, 81, Canadian ice hockey player (New York Rangers, Chicago Blackhawks, Buffalo Sabres).
Jean Gallois, 93, French musicologist.
Shekhar Joshi, 90, Indian author.
Kim Dong-gil, 94, South Korean poet and politician, MNA (1992–1996).
Felicitas Kuhn, 96, Austrian children's book illustrator.
Günter Lamprecht, 92, German actor (Berlin Alexanderplatz, Das Boot, World on a Wire).
Loretta Lynn, 90, American Hall of Fame country singer-songwriter ("Coal Miner's Daughter", "You Ain't Woman Enough (To Take My Man)", "The Pill"), Grammy winner (1972, 2004, 2010).
Gordon Beattie Martin, 90, Canadian sportscaster and politician, Saskatchewan MLA (1986–1991).
César Mascetti, 80, Argentine journalist and television news host (Telenoche).
Sergio Mims, 67, American film critic and historian, complications from colon cancer.
Eleanor Moore, 88, American baseball player (Fort Wayne Daisies, Grand Rapids Chicks), complications from pneumonia.
Jesús del Muro, 84, Mexican football player (Atlas, national team) and manager (Jalisco).
Peter Robinson, 72, British-born Canadian crime writer (Inspector Alan Banks).
Lucienne Schmidt-Couttet, 95, French Olympic alpine skier (1948).
Jürgen Sundermann, 82, German football player (FC Basel, West Germany national team) and manager (VfB Stuttgart).
Shigeki Tanaka, 91, Japanese runner.
Janet Thurlow, 96, American jazz singer, heart failure.
Jerry Vainisi, 80, American football executive (Chicago Bears).
Adam Walker, 31, Scottish rugby league player (Hull Kingston Rovers, Wakefield Trinity, national team), suicide.
Liam Ward, 92, Irish jockey.
Zhang Qiusheng, 83, Chinese children's book writer.

5
Tommy Boggs, 66, American baseball player (Atlanta Braves, Texas Rangers) and coach Concordia University Texas, cancer.
Alejandra González Pino, 54, Chilean politician, heart failure.
Wolfgang Kohlhaase, 91, German screenwriter (I Was Nineteen, Mama, I'm Alive) and film director (Solo Sunny).
Hans Lagerwall, 81, Swedish Olympic fencer (1960, 1964).
Sara Lee, 30, American professional wrestler (WWE) and television personality (WWE Tough Enough).
Harry Lehman, 87, American politician, member of the Ohio House of Representatives (1971–1980).
Lenny Lipton, 82, American poet and lyricist ("Puff, the Magic Dragon"), brain cancer.
Sulejman Maliqati, 94, Albanian footballer (Besa, Partizani, national team).
Bernard McGuirk, 64, American radio personality, brain cancer.
Ann-Christine Nyström, 78, Finnish singer.
Michael Papps, 90, Australian Olympic sport shooter (1960, 1964).
Barbara Stamm, 77, German politician, member (1976–2018) and president (2008–2018) of the Landtag of Bavaria.

6
Araz Alizadeh, 70, Azerbaijani politician, people's deputy (1991–1995).
Tekeste Baire, 69, Eritrean trade union activist (NCEW).
Hans Berger, 84, German trade unionist and politician, MP (1990–1994), president of the Union of Mining and Energy (1990–1997).
Adriana Breukink, 65, Dutch recorder player and maker.
Carl Fredrik Bunæs, 82, Norwegian Olympic sprinter (1960).
Fred Catero, 89, American record producer and engineer.
Husnija Fazlić, 79, Bosnian football player (1. FC Saarbrücken, Borac Banja Luka) and manager (SD Croatia Berlin).
John-Erik Franzén, 80, Swedish artist and painter.
Michel Herjean, 78, French trade unionist and Breton separatist.
Ivy Jo Hunter, 82, American songwriter ("Behind a Painted Smile", "Loving You Is Sweeter Than Ever", "Dancing in the Street").
Noé Jitrik, 94, Argentine literary critic, stroke.
Jody Miller, 80, American country singer ("Queen of the House"), Grammy winner (1966), complications from Parkinson's disease.
Gordon Mydland, 100, American politician, attorney general of South Dakota (1969–1973) and member of South Dakota Senate (1963–1968).
Vincent Eze Ogbulafor, 73, Nigerian politician.
Mary Ogg, 77, New Zealand politician, mayor of Gore (1995–2001).
Roy Radner, 95, American economist.
Phil Read, 83, English motorcycle racer, seven-time F.I.M. Road Racing champion.
Kenneth M. Sayre, 94, American philosopher.
Andreas Schnieders, 55, German Olympic boxer (1988).
Judy Tenuta, 72, American comedian, actress (The Weird Al Show, Going Down in LA-LA Land, There's No Such Thing as Vampires), and musician, ovarian cancer.
Ankica Tuđman, 96, Croatian socialite.
Gian Piero Ventrone, 62, Italian football fitness coach (Juventus, Tottenham Hotspur, national team), acute myeloid leukemia.
Günter Vetter, 86, Austrian politician.

7
Warren J. Baker, 84, American academic administrator, president of Cal Poly San Luis Obispo (1979–2010).
Arun Bali, 79, Indian actor (Chanakya, Swabhimaan, Hey Ram).
Leon Burton, 87, American football player (Arizona State Sun Devils, New York Titans).
William Sheldrick Conover, 94, American politician, member of the U.S. House of Representatives (1972–1973).
Ronnie Cuber, 80, American jazz saxophonist.
Ada Fisher, 74, American physician and politician.
Ann Flood, 89, American actress (The Edge of Night, From These Roots, Mystic Pizza).
Fernando González Gortázar, 79, Mexican architect, sculptor and writer.
Paul-Mounged El-Hachem, 88, Lebanese Maronite Catholic prelate, eparch of Baalbek-Deir El Ahmar (1995–2005).
Horst Hülß, 84, German football player (Viktoria Köln, 1. FSV Mainz 05) and manager (SV Wiesbaden).
Toshi Ichiyanagi, 89, Japanese composer and pianist.
Avtar Singh Jouhl, 84, Indian-born British anti-racism campaigner and lecturer.
Art Laboe, 97, American disc jockey (KXLA, KPOP), founder of Original Sound Records, pneumonia.
Brenda MacGibbon, 78, Canadian mathematician and statistician, complications from Alzheimer's disease and ALS.
Susanna Mildonian, 82, Belgian harpist.
Shoshana Netanyahu, 99, Israeli lawyer, justice of the Supreme Court (1981–1993).
Bill Nieder, 89, American shot putter, Olympic champion (1960).
Toru Ohno, 87, Japanese literary scholar.
Robert Pennywell, 67, American football player (Atlanta Falcons, Michigan Panthers).
Al Ries, 95, American marketing professional and author.
Cheryl Roberts, 60, South African Olympic table tennis player (1992), cancer.
Jure Robežnik, 89, Slovenian pianist and composer.
Austin Stoker, 92, Trinidadian-American actor (Assault on Precinct 13, Battle for the Planet of the Apes, Abby), kidney failure.
Sergio Tagliapietra, 87, Italian Olympic rower (1956, 1964).
Robert I. Toll, 81, American homebuilder, co-founder of Toll Brothers, complications from Parkinson's disease.
Anna Wahlgren, 80, Swedish author.
Zita Leeson Weinshienk, 89, American jurist, judge of the U.S. District Court of Colorado (1979–2011).
Ivan Wolffers, 74, Dutch writer and physician, prostate cancer.

8
Manuel Aguilera Gómez, 86, Mexican economist and politician, senator (1991–1993).
Martine Allain-Regnault, 85, French scientific journalist.
Brígida Baltar, 62, Brazilian visual artist, leukemia.
Gabrielle Beaumont, 80, British television director (Diana: A Tribute to the People's Princess, Star Trek: The Next Generation, Remington Steele).
Billy Al Bengston, 88, American visual artist and sculptor.
Chuck Bradley, 71, American football player (San Diego Chargers, Miami Dolphins, Chicago Bears).
Charlie Brown, 80, American DJ (WKIX) and radio presenter.
André Chagnon, 94, Canadian telecommunications executive and philanthropist, founder of Vidéotron.
William Chepkut, Kenyan politician, MP (2017–2022).
Ogunlade Davidson, 73, Sierra Leonean scientist.
John Duncan, 73, Scottish football player (Dundee, Tottenham Hotspur) and manager (Chesterfield).
Ron Gassert, 82, American football player (Green Bay Packers).
Grace Glueck, 96, American arts journalist (The New York Times, The New Criterion, Los Angeles Review of Books).
Julian Hammond, 79, American basketball player (Denver Rockets).
Val Joyce, 91, Irish radio broadcaster.
Gerben Karstens, 80, Dutch racing cyclist, Olympic champion (1964), complications from a stroke.
Faustino López Vargas, 64, Mexican politician, senator (since 2022), traffic collision.
Esther Peter-Davis, 90, French human rights activist and environmentalist.
Luis Sáinz Hinojosa, 86, Bolivian Roman Catholic prelate, auxiliary bishop of Cochabamba (1982–1987, 2001–2012) and archbishop of La Paz (1987–1996).
Ann Savours Shirley, 94, British polar exploration historian.
Peter Tobin, 76, Scottish serial killer and rapist.
Angus Trumble, 58, Australian art curator and historian, director of the National Portrait Gallery of Australia (2014–2018).
Meike de Vlas, 80, Dutch rower, European championships silver medallist (1964), cancer.
Frank Youso, 86, American football player (New York Giants, Minnesota Vikings, Oakland Raiders).

9
Temsüla Ao, 76, Indian poet and writer (Laburnum For My Head).
Leszek Tadeusz Biały, 82, Polish politician and teacher, deputy (1991–1993).
Samarjit Roy Chowdhury, 85, Bangladeshi painter.
Ted Crosbie, 91, Irish businessman and newspaper publisher.
Andrés Cuervo, 34, Colombian singer-songwriter.
Chuck Deardorf, 68, American jazz musician, COVID-19.
Yuriy Dehteryov, 74, Ukrainian footballer (Shakhtar Donetsk, Soviet Union national team).
Tony DeLuca, 85, American politician, member of the Pennsylvania House of Representatives (since 1983), lymphoma.
Nikki Finke, 68, American blogger and entertainment journalist, founder of Deadline Hollywood.
Alastair Fowler, 92, Scottish literary critic and editor.
Doug Langway, 52, American screenwriter and film director (BearCity), liver cancer.
Bruno Latour, 75, French philosopher and sociologist (Laboratory Life, Science in Action, We Have Never Been Modern), pancreatic cancer.
Cees Lute, 81, Dutch racing cyclist.
Margie Masters, 87, Australian professional golfer.
Bruce Pairaudeau, 91, Guyanese-New Zealand cricketer (British Guyana, Northern Districts, West Indies).
Eileen Ryan, 94, American actress (Magnolia, Parenthood, Benny & Joon).
Bhanwar Lal Sharma, 77, Indian politician, Rajasthan MLA (1985–1993, 1996–2008, since 2013).
Josep Soler i Sardà, 87, Spanish composer, writer, and music theorist.
Wendy Smits, 39, Dutch handball player (TuS Metzingen, HSG Blomberg-Lippe, national team).
Jack Thiessen, 91, Canadian lexicographer.
Kevin Thomas, 78, English footballer (Blackpool, Tranmere Rovers, Southport), stroke.
Susan Tolsky, 79, American actress (Madame's Place, Here Come the Brides, Darkwing Duck).

10
Subbu Arumugam, 94, Indian writer and storyteller.
Emeric Arus, 84, Romanian Olympic fencer (1960).
Roberto Bisacco, 83, Italian actor (Torso, Detective Belli, Romeo and Juliet).
Sergio Brighenti, 90, Italian football player (Inter Milan, Sampdoria, national team) and manager, heart attack.
Michael Callan, 86, American actor (West Side Story, Cat Ballou, Gidget Goes Hawaiian), pneumonia.
Alejandro Santiago Ciena, 44, Puerto Rican music video director.
Kenny Clayton, 86, British record producer, arranger and conductor.
Keith Eddy, 77, English footballer (Watford, Barrow, Sheffield United).
Dick Ellsworth, 82, American baseball player (Chicago Cubs, Boston Red Sox, Cleveland Indians).
Ferdinando Facchiano, 95, Italian lawyer and politician, deputy (1987–1994), minister for cultural and environmental heritage (1989–1991).
Sterling Johnson Jr., 88, American jurist, judge of the U.S. District Court of Eastern New York (since 1991).
Anita Kerr, 94, American singer, Grammy winner (1966, 1967).
Viktor Logunov, 78, Russian track cyclist, Olympic silver medalist (1964).
Fred Martin, 95, American artist.
Jim Niekamp, 76, American ice hockey player (Detroit Red Wings).
Roman Pelts, 85, Ukrainian-Canadian chess master.
Joe Roberts, 86, American basketball player (Ohio State Buckeyes, Syracuse Nationals, Kentucky Colonels) and coach.
Paavo Roininen, 87, Finnish Olympic boxer (1960).
Leon Schidlowsky, 91, Chilean-Israeli composer.
Allan Wood, 79, Australian swimmer, Olympic bronze medallist (1964), cancer.
James Wright, 83, American historian, president of Dartmouth College (1998–2009).
Mulayam Singh Yadav, 82, Indian politician, minister of defence (1996–1998), MP (1996–2004, since 2009) and three-time chief minister of Uttar Pradesh.

11
Doru Ana, 68, Romanian actor (The Man of the Day, Next Stop Paradise, Stuff and Dough).
Frøydis Armand, 73, Norwegian actress (Wives – Ten Years After, Hotel Cæsar).
Marion Boyd, 76, Canadian politician, Ontario MPP (1990–1999).
André Brassard, 76, Canadian film (Once Upon a Time in the East, The Late Blossom) and theatre director.
Jaroslav Čejka, 86, Czech dancer, mime, and actor.
Rick Cessar, 93, American politician, member of the Pennsylvania House of Representatives (1971–1994), heart failure.
Herbert Chabot, 91, American jurist, judge of the United States Tax Court (1978–2016), complications from COVID-19.
Joe Crozier, 93, Canadian ice hockey player (Toronto Maple Leafs) and coach (Buffalo Sabres, Rochester Americans).
Louis Denis, 94, Canadian ice hockey player (Montreal Canadiens).
Joan Fear, 90, New Zealand painter.
Harold Garde, 99, American painter.
Janice Gates, 57, American yoga instructor and therapist.
Beryl Goldwyn, 91, English ballet dancer, breast cancer.
A. Gopalakrishnan, 85, Indian nuclear engineer.
François Iselin, 82, Swiss architect and writer.
Dame Angela Lansbury, 96, British-American-Irish actress (The Manchurian Candidate, Sweeney Todd, Murder, She Wrote) and singer, five-time Tony winner.
Hikaru Matsunaga, 93, Japanese politician, minister of finance (1998), international trade (1989–1990) and education (1984–1985).
Jean-Louis Pelletier, 86, French criminal lawyer.
Sheikh Anne Rahman, 62, Bangladeshi politician, MP (since 2018).
Reza Roosta Azad, 60, Iranian academic, chancellor of Sharif University of Technology (2010–2014).
Altaf Ahmad Shah, 66, Indian Kashmiri separatist, renal cancer.
Charles Sherrod, 85, American civil rights activist.
Willie Spence, 23, American singer (American Idol), traffic collision.
Victor Steeman, 22, Dutch motorcycle racer, injuries sustained in race collision.

12
Bernardo Adam Ferrero, 80, Spanish composer, conductor and musicologist.
Jim Bailey, 87, American baseball player (Cincinnati Reds).
Linos Benakis, 94, Greek historian of philosophy.
Nigel Boddice, 69–70, British trumpeter and conductor.
Manoel Victor Cavalcante, 63, Brazilian politician, Santa Catarina MLA (1991–1995).
Jacques Cresta, 67, French politician, deputy (2012–2017).
George Forbes, 78, Scottish businessman, chairman of Newcastle United.
Peter Gumpel, 98, German Jesuit priest and historian.
Lucious Jackson, 80, American basketball player (Philadelphia 76ers, national team), Olympic champion (1964), heart failure.
Katsuya Kitamura, 36, Japanese professional wrestler (NJPW), bodybuilder, and mixed martial artist, heart failure.
N. Kovaithangam, 73, Indian politician, Tamil Nadu MLA (2001–2011).
Konstantin Landa, 50, Russian chess grandmaster.
Gary A. Lee, 89, American politician, member of the U.S. House of Representatives (1979–1983) and New York State Assembly (1975–1979).
Ngo Vinh Long, 78, Vietnamese-American historian.
Mary Adelia McLeod, 84, American Episcopal bishop, bishop of Vermont (1993–2001).
John Mulholland, 76, Irish politician, mayor of Galway (1986–1987, 1996–1997).
Billy Newman, 75, Irish footballer (Shelbourne, national team).
Ralph Pearson, 103, American chemist (HSAB theory).
Osmo Pekonen, 62, Finnish mathematician, science historian and writer.
Nikolay Petrunin, 46, Russian politician, deputy (since 2016), COVID-19.
Karen Poniachik, 57, Chilean journalist and politician, minister of mining (2006–2008).
Dariusz Raczyński, 60, Polish footballer (Lechia Gdańsk).
Jeremy Rogers, 85, British boat builder and sailor, complications of Alzheimer's disease and COVID-19.
Dolores Sloviter, 90, American jurist, judge of the U.S. Court of Appeals for the Third Circuit (since 1979).
Robert West, 94, American chemist.

13
Jeff Barnaby, 46, Canadian film director (Rhymes for Young Ghouls, Blood Quantum), cancer.
Doug Brignole, 63, American bodybuilder, COVID-19.
Jon Brittenum, 78, American football player (Arkansas Razorbacks, San Diego Chargers).
Peter Butler, 90, English golfer. (death announced on this date)
Ding Wenchang, 89, Chinese air force officer.
Fuzzy, 83, Danish composer (Eight Hours Don't Make a Day).
Verckys Kiamuangana Mateta, 78, Congolese saxophonist and composer.
James McDivitt, 93, American astronaut (Gemini 4, Apollo 9).
Mohamed Latiff Mohamed, 72, Singaporean poet and writer.
Pim van de Meent, 84, Dutch football player (DOS) and coach (De Graafschap, NEC Nijmegen).
Halvor Næs, 94, Norwegian Olympic ski jumper (1952, 1960).
Jan Rabson, 68, American voice actor (Akira, Leisure Suit Larry, James Bond Jr.), heart attack.
Dagmar Rom, 94, Austrian skier, Olympic silver medallist (1952).
Stavros Sarafis, 72, Greek football player (PAOK, national team) and manager, stroke.
Moe Savransky, 93, American baseball player (Cincinnati Redlegs).
Mike Schank, 53, American musician and actor (American Movie, Storytelling, Hamlet A.D.D.), cancer.
Rollie Seltz, 98, American basketball player (Anderson Packers, Waterloo Hawks, Saint Paul Lights).
Joyce Sims, 63, American R&B singer-songwriter ("Come Into My Life").
Lennart Söderberg, 81, Swedish football player (AIK) and manager (Gefle, Västerås).
John Spender, 86, Australian politician and diplomat, MP (1980–1990) and ambassador to France (1996–2000).
Ben Stevens, 63, American politician, member (2001–2007) and president (2005–2007) of the Alaska Senate.
Bruce Sutter, 69, American Hall of Fame baseball player (Chicago Cubs, St. Louis Cardinals, Atlanta Braves).

14
Zhaneta Andrea, 85, Albanian archeologist.
Raymond Argentin, 97, French Olympic sprint canoeist (1948).
Alfredo Chiappori, 79, Italian cartoonist.
Adam Clapham, 82, British television director and producer (Doomsday Gun).
Robbie Coltrane, 72, Scottish actor (Harry Potter, Cracker, GoldenEye) and comedian, multiple organ failure.
Eric Crone, 75, Danish film producer.
Dieter Dieckhoff, 93, German farmer and politician, member of the Landtag of Lower Saxony (1974–1990).
Ross Fichtner, 83, American football player (Cleveland Browns, New Orleans Saints), complications from Parkinson's disease.
Étienne Gaboury, 92, Canadian architect (Precious Blood Roman Catholic Church, Saint Boniface Cathedral, Esplanade Riel).
Jan van der Graaf, 85, Dutch church administrator, general secretary of the Reformed Association in the Protestant Church in the Netherlands (1973–2001).
Alan Halsey, 73, British poet.
Abu al-Hasan al-Hashimi al-Qurashi, Iraqi Islamic militant, caliph of the Islamic State (since 2022), shot.
Yoshiki Hiki, 89, Japanese Olympic rower (1956).
George Johanson, 94, American painter, printmaker, and ceramic tile artist.
Feliks W. Kres, 56, Polish writer.
Stanislav Kropilák, 67, Slovak Hall of Fame basketball player (Inter Bratislava, BK Pardubice, CEP Fleurus).
Gerrit van der Linde, 95, Dutch jurist, justice of the Supreme Court (1981–1997).
Muhammad Noor Meskanzai, 66, Pakistani jurist, chief justice of the Balochistan High Court (2014–2018) and the Federal Shariat Court (since 2021), shot.
Mariana Nicolesco, 73, Romanian operatic soprano.
Alexandros Nikolaidis, 42, Greek taekwondo athlete, Olympic silver medalist (2004, 2008), cancer.
Timothy O'Brien, 93, British theatre designer, prostate cancer.
Ed Olivares, 84, Puerto Rican baseball player (St. Louis Cardinals).
Kay Parker, 78, British pornographic actress (Sex World, Dracula Sucks, Taboo), cancer.
Kedar Singh Phonia, 92, Indian politician, Uttar Pradesh (1991–2002) and Uttarakhand (2007–2012) MLA.
N. U. Prabhu, 98, Indian-American mathematician.
Ljubisav Rakić, 91, Serbian neurobiologist and academic.
Preben Rudiengaard, 78, Danish physician and politician, MP (1998–2011).
Georg Scholz, 64, German medical officer and politician, member of the Landtag of North Rhine-Westphalia (2000–2005).
André Spénard, 72, Canadian politician, Quebec MNA (2012–2018).
Roberto Vencato, 70, Italian Olympic sailor (1976).
Julien Vrebos, 75, Belgian film director.
Ted White, 96, American stuntman (Escape from New York, Road House) and actor (Friday the 13th: The Final Chapter).
Ralf Wolter, 95, German actor (One, Two, Three, Cabaret, What Is the Matter with Willi?).

15
Milton Cabral, 101, Brazilian engineer and politician, deputy (1964–1971), two-time senator, governor of Paraíba (1986–1987).
Noel Duggan, 73, Irish musician (Clannad, The Duggans).
Billur Kalkavan, 59, Turkish actress (The Blue Exile, The Queen Is in the Factory, Acayip Hikayeler), lung cancer.
Ken Kortas, 80, American football player (Pittsburgh Steelers).
Sylvia Laughter, 63, American politician, member of the Arizona House of Representatives (1999–2005), complications from COVID-19.
Jay Owen Light, 81, American academic administrator.
Cyrus Mann, 66, American basketball player (Crispa Redmanizers), COVID-19.
Horst Metz, 77, German politician, member of the Landtag of Saxony (1990–2009).
Mikaben, 41, Haitian singer, songwriter, and producer, cardiac arrest.
K. Murari, 78, Indian film producer (Seetamalakshmi, Seetharama Kalyanam, Srinivasa Kalyanam).
Tullio Pozzan, 73, Italian biochemist.
William H. Rowden, 92, American vice admiral.
Simon Roy, 54, Canadian author, brain cancer.
Marty Sammon, 45, American blues pianist (Buddy Guy).
O. P. Sharma, 80, Indian magician.
Thomas Sleeper, 66, American composer and conductor, complications from amyotrophic lateral sclerosis.

16
Doris Margaret Anderson, 100, Canadian politician, senator (1995–1997).
Jüri Arrak, 85, Estonian painter.
Joyce Aylard, 97, British codebreaker.
Vidmantas Bačiulis, 82, Lithuanian screenwriter and film director.
Lodewijk van den Berg, 90, Dutch-born American chemical engineer and astronaut (STS-51-B).
Benjamin Civiletti, 87, American lawyer, attorney general (1979–1981) and deputy attorney general (1978–1979), complications from Parkinson's disease.
Katherine Duncan-Jones, 81, British literature and Shakespeare scholar, complications of dementia.
Malcolm Patrick Galt, 93, Trinidadian Roman Catholic prelate, bishop of Bridgetown (1995–2005).
Satya Mohan Joshi, 102, Nepali literary scholar (Hamro Lok Sanskriti).
Lee Yong-hui, 91, South Korean politician, MNA (1973–1980, 1985–1988, 2004–2012).
Dilip Mahalanabis, 87, Indian pediatrician.
Manoj Singh Mandavi, 58, Indian politician, Chhattisgarh MLA (since 2013), heart attack.
Robert McKinley, 94, Canadian politician, MP (1965–1980).
Helen Michaluk, 92, Belarusian activist, chair of the Association of Belarusians in Great Britain (1997–2013).
Paulo Henrique Paes Landim, 84, Brazilian doctor and politician, Piauí MLA (1991–2007).
Josef Somr, 88, Czech actor (Closely Watched Trains, The Joke, How the World Is Losing Poets).
Ronald Stedman, 95, British Olympic swimmer (1948).
Margaret Sumner, 81, Australian lawn bowler.
Vaishali Takkar, 30, Indian actress (Sasural Simar Ka, Super Sisters - Chalega Pyar Ka Jaadu, Vish Ya Amrit: Sitara), suicide by hanging.
Ian Whittaker, 94, British set decorator (Alien, Howards End) and actor (The Revenge of Frankenstein), Oscar winner (1993), prostate cancer.
Josef Zemann, 99, Austrian mineralogist and geologist.

17
Ahmad Akbari, 75, Iranian Olympic fencer (1976).
Masum Aziz, 70, Bangladeshi actor (Ghani, Rabeya, Eito Prem), cancer.
Borys Bespalyi, 69, Ukrainian politician, MP (1998–2007).
Claudio Biern Boyd, 81, Spanish animator (The World of David the Gnome, Gladiator Academy), founder of BRB Internacional.
Jagoda Buić, 92, Croatian visual artist.
Dame Carmen Callil, 84, Australian publisher, founder of Virago Press, leukaemia.
Antonio Del Prete, 87, Italian lawyer and politician, senator (1983–1987), deputy (1994–1996).
Heinz-Jörg Eckhold, 81, German politician, member of the Landtag of North Rhine-Westphalia (1995–2005).
Josef Fales, 84, Ukrainian footballer (Karpaty Lviv).
Om Gurung, 69, Nepali sociologist, cancer.
Reza Haghighatnejad, 45, Iranian journalist (Radio Farda), colon cancer.
Sayed Yousuf Halim, 62, Afghan judge, chief justice of Afghanistan (2014–2021), heart failure.
Daniel Hwang, 69, Taiwanese politician, member of the Legislative Yuan (1999–2012).
Yury Klimov, 82, Russian handball player and coach, Olympic champion (1976).
Frances Muñoz, 92, American judge, cardiac arrest.
Albert Nolan, 88, South African Roman Catholic priest and theologian.
Rajes Perumal, 37, Malaysian footballer (PKNS, Kedah Darul Aman, Petaling Jaya City), traffic collision.
Peter Polleruhs, 72, Austrian engineer and politician, MP (1993–2002).
Michael Ponti, 84, German pianist.
Roberto Rojas, 55, Bolivian politician, deputy (2010–2015).
Ashot Sarkisov, 98, Russian nuclear physicist, member of the Russian Academy of Sciences (since 1994).
Leonardas Sauka, 91, Lithuanian folklorist, linguist and translator.
Claude Saunier, 79, French politician, mayor of Saint-Brieuc (1983–2001) and senator (1989–2008), cardiac arrest.
Zbigniew Senkowski, 66, Polish trade union activist and politician, deputy (1997–2001).
Ethevaldo Mello de Siqueira, 90, Brazilian journalist, science writer, and consultant.
Younoussi Touré, 80, Malian politician, prime minister (1992–1993) and president of the National Assembly (2012–2013).
Angelo Venosa, 68, Brazilian sculptor, complications from amyotrophic lateral sclerosis.
Franz Vorrath, 85, German Roman Catholic prelate, auxiliary bishop of Essen (1995–2014).

18
Roger Amuruz, 63, Peruvian engineer and politician, deputy (1992–2000).
Robert Arrigo, 67, Maltese politician, MP (since 2003) and mayor of Sliema (1994–2003), cancer.
Clerence Chyntia Audry, 28, Indonesian actress (Anak Jalanan), blood cancer.
Guy Avanzini, 93, French academic and philosopher.
Thomas Cahill, 82, American scholar and writer (How the Irish Saved Civilization).
Charles A. Clarke, 80, Liberian politician.
Charles Duncan Jr., 96, American businessman and politician, secretary of energy (1979–1981) and president of the Coca-Cola Company (1972–1974), complications from a fall.
Pablo Eisenberg, 90, American scholar, social justice advocate, and tennis player.
Ole Ellefsæter, 83, Norwegian cross-country skier, world (1966) and Olympic champion (1968), and singer, cardiac arrest.
Robert Gordon, 75, American rockabilly singer.
Henri Le Breton, 94, French politician, senator (1981–2001), mayor of Buléon (1953–2008).
Tom Maddox, 77, American science fiction writer, stroke.
John P. Meier, 80, American biblical scholar and Roman Catholic priest.
Bülend Özveren, 79, Turkish television presenter and sports commentator.
Valery Rubakov, 67, Russian theoretical physicist, member of the Russian Academy of Sciences (since 1998), complications from COVID-19.
Eugen Simion, 89, Romanian essayist and historian.
Charlie Smithgall, 77, American politician, mayor of Lancaster, Pennsylvania (1998–2006), heart disease.
Gus Stavros, 97, American businessman and philanthropist.
Earl Strinden, 90, American politician, member of the North Dakota House of Representatives (1967–1989).
Jean Teulé, 69, French novelist (The Suicide Shop), cartoonist, and screenwriter, cardiac arrest.
Harvey Wollman, 87, American politician, governor (1978–1979) and lieutenant governor (1975–1978) of South Dakota, member of the South Dakota Senate (1968–1970).
Yuri Zubakov, 78, Russian politician.

19
Funminiyi Afuye, 66, Nigerian lawyer and politician, member (2007–2011, since 2019) and speaker (since 2019) of the Ekiti State House of Assembly.
Omar Borrás, 93, Uruguayan football manager (national team).
Nicole Catala, 86, French academic and politician, member of the Council of Paris (1989–2008) and deputy (1988–2002).
Stanisław Ciosek, 83, Polish politician, deputy (1972–1985), minister of labor and social policy (1983–1984).
Dália da Cunha-Sammer, 93, Portuguese Olympic gymnast (1952, 1960).
Louis Gigante, 90, American Roman Catholic priest.
Dave Herman, 81, American football player (New York Jets).
Kassian Lauterer, 88, Austrian Roman Catholic priest, abbot of Wettingen-Mehrerau (1968–2009) and member of the Cistercians (since 1952).
Lucienne Legrand, 102, French actress (Hungarian Rhapsody, The Contessa's Secret, A Little Romance).
Dina Merhav, 86, Yugoslav-born Israeli sculptor.
Kōji Nakamoto, 81, Japanese actor (Yawara!, Asako I & II), comedian, and guitarist (The Drifters), traffic collision.
John Jay Osborn Jr., 77, American author (The Paper Chase), squamous cell carcinoma.
Joanna Simon, 85, American opera singer, thyroid cancer.
Ali Tehrani, 96, Iranian Shia Islamic theologian and writer.
Charley Trippi, 100, American Hall of Fame football player (Chicago Cardinals).
Philip Waruinge, 77, Kenyan boxer, Olympic silver medallist (1972).
Ibrahim Zukanović, 64, Bosnian football player (Čelik Zenica) and manager (Sloga Uskoplje, Iskra Bugojno).

20
Travis Basevi, 47, Australian cricket statistician and historian, cancer.
Atarah Ben-Tovim, 82, British flautist, cancer.
Jacques Brault, 89, Canadian poet and translator.
Bettye Crutcher, 83, American songwriter ("Who's Making Love").
Anton Donchev, 92, Bulgarian writer (Time of Parting).
Tom Emberton, 90, American politician and jurist, judge of the Kentucky Court of Appeals (1987–2004), house fire.
Hal Jones, 89, Canadian ice hockey player (Trail Smoke Eaters).
Helmut Kuhlmann, 82, German politician, member of the Landtag of Lower Saxony (1974–1998).
Blanche Lemco van Ginkel, 98, British-born Canadian architect and city planner.
Ron Masak, 86, American actor (Murder, She Wrote, Tora! Tora! Tora!, Evel Knievel).
Josephine Melville, 61, British actress (EastEnders, The Bill).
Jimmy Millar, 87, Scottish football player (Rangers, national team) and manager (Raith Rovers).
Lucy Simon, 82, American composer (The Secret Garden) and folk singer (The Simon Sisters), Grammy winner (1981, 1983), breast cancer.
Trevor Stamp, 4th Baron Stamp, 87, British medical doctor and hereditary peer, member of the House of Lords (1987–1999).
Al Sutton, 88, American anti-racism activist, jazz pianist and actor.
Tsin Ting, 88, Taiwanese singer and voice actress (Diau Charn, The Love Eterne, The Mermaid).
Louis Kotra Uregei, 71, New Caledonian businessman, politician, and trade unionist.

21
May Blood, Baroness Blood, 84, Northern Irish peer, member of the House of Lords (1999–2018), brain cancer.
Jim Bolla, 70, American college basketball coach (UNLV Lady Rebels, Hawaii Rainbow Wahine).
Waldemar Fibigr, 56, Czech Olympic sprint canoer (1988, 1992).
Marcin Giżycki, 71, Polish film and art historian, critic, and filmmaker.
Robert Gordy, 91, American music publishing executive and actor (Lady Sings the Blues).
Tom Hoover, 81, American drag racer.
Wolfgang Jenssen, 80, German politician, member of the Landtag of Rhineland-Palatinate (1971–1979).
Masato Kudo, 32, Japanese footballer (Kashiwa Reysol, Sanfrecce Hiroshima, national team), complications from brain surgery.
Cynthia Lai, 68, Hong Kong-born Canadian politician, Toronto city councillor (since 2018), gallbladder cancer.
Yoshimi Osawa, 96, Japanese judoka, pneumonia.
John Ponsonby, 67, British Royal Air Force officer.
Carmelo Ríos, 63, Puerto Rican Olympic athlete (1984).
Rainer Schaller, 53, German entrepreneur (McFit, Gold's Gym), plane crash.
Peter Schjeldahl, 80, American art critic (The New Yorker, The New York Times, ARTnews) and poet, lung cancer.
David Scott, 75, English poet.
Charles F. Stevens, 88, American neuroscientist.
Silvana Suárez, 64, Argentine beauty queen, Miss World (1978), colon cancer.
Asher Tlalim, 72, Israeli filmmaker, cancer.
War of Attrition, 23, Irish racehorse, Cheltenham Gold Cup winner (2006).
Harry White, 78, Australian jockey.
Xu Guangchun, 77, Chinese politician, CPC secretary of Henan (2004–2009).

22
Bernard Atha, 94, English actor (Kes, Coronation Street) and politician, mayor of Leeds (2000–2001).
Umberto Bellocco, 84, Italian mobster, founder of Bellocco 'ndrina.
John Blackburn, 90, British abstract painter.
Patrick Coveney, 88, Irish Roman Catholic prelate, archbishop and apostolic nuncio (1985–2009).
Leszek Engelking, 67, Polish writer and translator.
Rodney Graham, 73, Canadian visual artist and musician.
Pádraigh Griffin, 47, Irish Gaelic footballer (Clonakilty, Cork).
Burt Gustafson, 96, American football coach (Green Bay Packers).
Dietrich Mateschitz, 78, Austrian businessman, co-founder of Red Bull GmbH.
Aksel Nærstad, 70, Norwegian politician.
Qian Zhengying, 99, Chinese hydrologist and politician, vice chairperson of the CPPCC (1988–1993), minister of water resources (1974–1988) and member of the CAE.
Aristidis Rapanakis, 68, Greek sailor, Olympic bronze medalist (1980).
Maurice Rich, 90, Australian Olympic athlete (1956).
Marianna Roshal-Stroyeva, 97, Russian film director (The White Poodle).
Lori Saint-Martin, 63, Canadian writer and translator.

23
Vanilla Beane, 103, American milliner and fashion designer.
Walt Corey, 84, American football player and coach (Kansas City Chiefs, Buffalo Bills).
Don Edwards, 86, American cowboy singer and actor (The Horse Whisperer).
Marian Fuks, 108, Polish historian, director of the Jewish Historical Institute (1968–1969, 1971–1973).
Walter Gaudnek, 91, German artist.
Amou Haji, 94, Iranian hermit, known as "the world's dirtiest man".
George Nelson Hunt III, 90, American Episcopal prelate, bishop of Rhode Island (1980–1994).
Michael Kopsa, 66, Canadian actor (X-Men: Evolution, Mobile Suit Gundam, Fantastic Four), complications from a brain tumour.
John Lilipaly, 79, Dutch politician, MP (1986–1998), complications from Alzheimer's disease.
Ian MacLeod, 77, Canadian football player (Edmonton Eskimos).
Carlos Melancia, 95, Portuguese politician, governor of Macau (1987–1991).
Paul Morantz, 77, American attorney and investigative journalist.
Adriano Moreira, 100, Portuguese lawyer and politician, MP (1980–1995) and member of the council of state (2016–2019).
Libor Pešek, 89, Czech conductor (Royal Liverpool Philharmonic, CNSO, Slovak Philharmonic).
Galina Pisarenko, 88, Russian opera singer (Stanislavski and Nemirovich-Danchenko Theatre, Komische Oper Berlin) and voice teacher (Moscow Conservatory).
Rock of Gibraltar, 23, Irish thoroughbred racehorse and sire, heart failure.
Arshad Sharif, 49, Pakistani investigative journalist (ARY News, Aaj News, Dunya News), shot.
Cassius Turvey, 15, Australian teenager, injuries from assault.
Benno Zech, 94, German teacher and politician, member of the Landtag of Rhineland-Palatinate (1983–1987).

24
Ash Carter, 68, American politician, secretary of defense (2015–2017), heart attack.
Pinaki Chaudhuri, 82, Indian film director (Chena Achena, Kakababu Here Gelen?, Ek Tukro Chand), cancer.
Ken Fairweather, 77, Papua New Guinean politician, MP (2007–2017).
Christine Farnon, 97, American music industry executive (NARAS).
Ben Feigin, 47, American television producer (Schitt's Creek, Cheech & Chong: Roasted), Emmy winner (2020), pancreatic cancer.
Myer Horowitz, 89, Canadian academic, president of the University of Alberta (1979–1989).
Leslie Jordan, 67, American actor (Will & Grace, Hearts Afire, Call Me Kat), Emmy winner (2006), heart failure.
Yuri Kosin, 74, Ukrainian photographer.
Milomir Kovac, 60, Serbian-German veterinary surgeon, equine specialist and columnist.
Vladimir Kulakov, 86, Belarusian politician.
Thomas Meade, 86, British epidemiologist.
Patricia Morán, 97, Mexican actress (Another Spring), first lady of Chihuahua (1968–1974).
Urs Nussbaumer, 91, Swiss agronomic engineer and politician, councilor (1979–1991).
Allison R. Palmer, 95, American paleontologist and geologist.
Fa'afiaula Sagote, 41, Samoan actor (The Orator).
Laila Shawa, 82, Palestinian visual artist.
Dieter Werkmüller, 85, German academic and lawyer.
Terry Willetts, 82, English cricketer (Somerset, Cornwall).
Tomasz Wójtowicz, 69, Polish Hall of Fame volleyball player (Legia Warsaw, Santal Parma), Olympic champion (1976).
Peter Yang, 87, Hong Kong film director (The Escape) and actor (You Can't Tell Him, The Ammunition Hunters), bladder cancer.
Anatoly Zourpenko, 46, Greek-Russian basketball player (Olympiacos, Papagou, Panellinios).

25
Mohammad Abbas Ansari, 86, Indian Islamic cleric and political activist.
Husnija Arapović, 78, Bosnian football player (Čelik Zenica, Borac Banja Luka) and manager (Schaffhausen).
Jules Bass, 87, American animator and television producer (Rudolph the Red-Nosed Reindeer, Frosty the Snowman, The Last Unicorn), co-founder of Rankin/Bass Productions.
Othman Battikh, 81, Tunisian Islamic scholar.
Barbara Cooper, 93, American politician, member of the Tennessee House of Representatives (since 1996).
Mike Davis, 76, American author (City of Quartz, Late Victorian Holocausts, Set the Night on Fire) and activist, esophageal cancer.
Gordon Fee, 88, American Christian theologian.
Leonie Forbes, 85, Jamaican actress (Milk and Honey, Soul Survivor, Shattered Image), broadcaster and producer.
Peter Gabel, 75, American legal scholar and magazine editor (Tikkun).
Jim Halligan, 86, American academic administrator (Oklahoma State University) and politician, member of the Oklahoma Senate (2008–2016).
Branislav Hronec, 81, Slovak composer, pianist and conductor.
Kent Johnson, 67, American poet, translator and critic.
Kim Keum-soo, 84, South Korean labor activist.
Halit Kıvanç, 97, Turkish journalist (Milliyet, Tercüman, Hürriyet), television and radio presenter.
Lewis Kuller, 88, American epidemiologist.
Aristotelis Pavlidis, 78, Greek politician, minister for the Aegean (2004–2007).
Brian Robinson, 91, British road racing cyclist.
Franco Stradella, 81, Italian businessman and politician, deputy (1996–2013).
Tony Street, 96, Australian politician, minister for foreign affairs (1980–1983) and MP (1966–1984).
Charles Wheeler, 96, American politician, member of the Missouri Senate (2003–2007) and mayor of Kansas City, Missouri (1971–1979).
Farquhar Wilkinson, 90, New Zealand cellist, principal cellist of the New Zealand Symphony Orchestra (1955–1992).

26
Mashallah Abdullayev, 72, Azerbaijani military officer, National Hero (1992).
Michael Basman, 76, English chess master.
Arthur Bernard, 82, French author, academic, and historian.
Mike Birch, 90, Canadian navigator.
Imre Forgács, 73, Hungarian jurist, minister of justice (2009–2010).
Lucianne Goldberg, 87, American literary agent and author.
Hsu Yung Chin, 70, Taiwanese calligrapher.
Vladimir Kostrov, 87, Russian poet, translator and playwright.
George Nedungatt, 89, Indian Jesuit priest and canonist.
Vinayak Nimhan, 59, Indian politician, Maharashtra MLA (1999–2014), cancer.
Lia Origoni, 103, Italian singer and stage actress.
Julie Powell, 49, American author, subject of Julie & Julia, cardiac arrest.
Agustín Ramírez, 70, Mexican singer-songwriter (Los Caminantes).
James Roose-Evans, 94, British theatre director, priest and writer.
Sebastian von Rotenhan, 72, German forester and politician, member of the Landtag of Bavaria (1998–2008).
Esmayeel Shroff, 62, Indian film director (Thodisi Bewafaii, God and Gun, Police Public).
Pierre Soulages, 102, French visual artist.
Mark Vanmoerkerke, 70, Belgian entrepreneur and politician, senator (1994–1995).
Rosalind Wiener Wyman, 92, American politician, member of the Los Angeles city council (1954–1965).
Christopher Yvon, 52, British diplomat, ambassador to North Macedonia (2010–2014).

27
Pedro Nicolás Bermúdez Villamizar, 93, Venezuelan Roman Catholic prelate, auxiliary bishop of Caracas (1997–2009), member of the C.I.M.
Stan Bingham, 76, American politician, member of the North Carolina Senate (2001–2017).
Bill Brison, 92, English Anglican priest.
Semisi Fakahau, 74, Tongan politician, MP (since 2014).
Joe Frank, 79, American politician, mayor of Newport News, Virginia (1996–2010).
Vladimir Gligorov, 77, Serbian economist.
Nipon Goswami, 80, Indian actor (Shakuntala Aru Sankar Joseph Ali, Hiya Diya Niya, Jonaki Mon).
William W. Hay, 88, American geologist.
Fritz Huitfeldt, 83, Norwegian lawyer and politician.
Geraldine Hunt, 77, American R&B singer ("Can't Fake the Feeling").
Irakli Khakhubia, 51, Georgian economist, engineer, and politician.
Lee Kai-ming, 85, Hong Kong politician, MLC (1995–2000).
Donato Manfroi, 82, Italian politician, senator (1992–2001).
Joyce Molyneux, 91, British restaurateur.
Maurice Olender, 76, French historian.
Satheeshan Pacheni, 54, Indian politician, stroke.
Rodney Peppé, 88, British author and illustrator.
Carlos de la Rosa, 78, Argentine lawyer and politician, senator (1995–2001).
Steve Sesnick, 81, American band manager (The Velvet Underground), complications from a heart attack.
Tim Steeves, 58, Canadian comedian and television writer (The Rick Mercer Report, This Hour Has 22 Minutes, Still Standing), pancreatic cancer.
Gerald Stern, 97, American poet.
Bahaa Taher, 87, Egyptian novelist.
Hank Weber, 97, American politician, member of the North Dakota Senate (1965–1966) and House of Representatives (1963–1964, 1967–1980).

28
Eric Jean Baptiste, 52, Haitian politician and entrepreneur, shot.
Neel Pawan Baruah, 86, Indian artist.
Calvin O. Butts, 73, American pastor and academic administrator, president of the State University of New York at Old Westbury (1999–2020).
Domenico Contestabile, 85, Italian lawyer and politician, senator (1994-2006).
Herman Daly, 84, American economist.
Vince Dooley, 90, American Hall of Fame college football coach (Georgia Bulldogs).
Dan Flynn, 79, American politician, businessman and rancher, member of the Texas House of Representatives (2003–2021).
Jules Hardy, 90, Canadian neuroscientist.
Ted Hayward, 98, English lawn bowler.
Ian Jack, 77, British journalist (Granta, The Guardian) and writer.
Marc Kravetz, 80, French journalist.
Jerry Lee Lewis, 87, American Hall of Fame singer ("Great Balls of Fire", "Whole Lotta Shakin' Going On", "High School Confidential") and pianist.
Helena Łazarska, 88, Polish operatic and vocal pedagogue.
Andrzej Magowski, 56, Polish football player (Olimpia Poznań, Herzlake) and coach (Dąb Barcin).
P. J. McElroy, 90, Northern Irish Gaelic footballer (Liatroim Fontenoys).
D. H. Peligro, 63, American drummer (Dead Kennedys, Red Hot Chili Peppers), head trauma.
Hannah Pick-Goslar, 93, German-born Israeli Holocaust survivor (Laatste Zeven Maanden van Anne Frank).
Safwan al-Qudsi, 82, Syrian politician, MP (since 1977).
Larry South, 97, Canadian politician, Ontario MPP (1985–1990).
Frankie Wilson, 52, Northern Irish Gaelic footballer (Antrim), bile duct cancer.
Heinz Winkler, 73, Italian-German chef, multiple organ failure.

29
Serafín Bejérez, 70, Uruguayan farmer and politician, intendant of Cerro Largo (1998–1999).
Hugo Camps, 79, Belgian journalist, columnist and writer.
François Chesnais, 88, French economist.
Curt Gentry, 81, American football player (Chicago Bears) and coach.
James Giffen, 81, American businessman.
Conrad Landry, 83, Canadian politician, New Brunswick MLA (1978–1995).
Wolfgang Lange, 84, German Olympic canoeist (1960, 1968).
Paul Larson, 90, American football player (Chicago Cardinals, Oakland Raiders).
Maurice Ligot, 94, French civil administrator and politician, deputy (1973–1976, 1978–2002), mayor of Cholet (1965–1995).
Mikhail Mashkovtsev, 75, Russian politician, governor of Kamchatka Krai (2000–2007).
Sir Peter Morris, 88, Australian surgeon, bowel cancer.
Donal Moynihan, 81, Irish politician, TD (1982–1989, 1992–2007).
Lukas Nola, 58, Croatian film director (Russian Meat, Celestial Body, Alone), cancer.
Park Sil, 83, South Korean journalist and politician, MNA (1985–1996).
Hava Pinhas-Cohen, 67, Israeli poet and writer.
Susan Kelly Power, 97, American author and activist.
Daniel Schmutz, 79, Swiss administrator and politician, Vaud state councillor (1981–1998).
Heinrich Schneier, 96, German politician, member of the Landtag of Bavaria (1962–1974).
Robin Sylvester, 71–72, British bassist (RatDog).
Kirpa Ram Vij, 87, Singaporean civil servant and military officer, director, general staff (1970–1974).

30
Ian Angus, 96, British librarian and editor.
Andrew Dawes, 82, Canadian violinist.
Peter de Savary, 78, British businessman, chairman of Millwall F.C. (2005–2006), heart attack.
Martine Djibo, Ivorian educator and politician, MP (1975–1980, 1990–2010).
Serge Dufoulon, 66, Tunisian-born French academic and sociologist.
Mike Fanning, 69, American football player (Los Angeles Rams, Detroit Lions, Seattle Seahawks).
René Fatoux, 86, French footballer (Lille OSC, Red Star F.C.).
Ștefan Ionescu, 87, Romanian Olympic ice hockey player (1964, 1968).
Kim Won-ung, 78, South Korean politician, MNA (1992–1996, 2000–2008).
Rosemarie Köhn, 83, German-born Norwegian Church of Norway cleric, bishop of Hamar (1993–2006).
Miklós Lukáts, 76, Hungarian politician, MP (1990–1994).
Hugh McKean, 55, American politician, member of the Colorado House of Representatives (since 2017), heart attack.
Anthony Ortega, 94, American jazz clarinetist, saxophonist and flautist.
Donald Hill Perkins, 97, British physicist.
Les Piggot, 80, British Olympic sprinter (1972).
Shane Reed, 49, New Zealand Olympic triathlete (2008), brain cancer.
Reza Rezaee, 61, Iranian-Norwegian politician.
Jack Terry, 92, Polish-American author and Holocaust survivor.
Sammy Wilson, 85, Northern Irish footballer (Coleraine, Glenavon, Falkirk).
Lucyna Wiśniewska, 67, Polish politician, deputy (2005–2007).
Marek Wojtera, 58, Polish politician and farmer, deputy (2005–2007).

31
Abbas Ali Akhtari, 82, Iranian ayatollah, MP (1980–1984, 2004–2008) and member of the Assembly of Experts (since 2020), cancer.
Philippe Alexandre, 90, French journalist and writer.
Hans Ulrich Baumberger, 90, Swiss entrepreneur and politician, councillor (1971–1975), member of the Council of States (1975–1983).
Sonali Chakraborty, 59, Indian actress (Tak Jhal Mishti, Bandhan).
T. J. Chandrachoodan, 82, Indian politician.
Gentil Delázari, 82, Brazilian Roman Catholic prelate, bishop of Sinop (1995–2016).
Bob Ellicott, 95, Australian jurist and politician, attorney-general (1975–1977), MP (1974–1981) and minister for home affairs (1977–1981).
Geoff Feehan, 87, Australian footballer (St Kilda, Norwood).
Jamshed Jiji Irani, 86, Indian steel industrialist, director of Tata Steel (1998–2001).
Danny Javier, 75, Filipino musician (APO Hiking Society).
Raj Kanwar, 92, Indian journalist (The Tribune, The Indian Express, The Statesman) and writer, heart attack.
Samuel Katz, 95, American pediatrician and virologist.
Jeremy Mansfield, 59, South African radio presenter (Radio 702, 947), liver cancer.
Marvin March, 92, American set decorator (Annie, The Sunshine Boys, Lethal Weapon).
Anna McCurley, 79, Scottish politician, MP (1983–1987).
John McVay, 91, American football coach (New York Giants) and executive (San Francisco 49ers).
José Nambi, 73, Angolan Roman Catholic prelate, bishop of Kwito-Bié (since 1997).
Humphrey Bamisebi Olumakaiye, 53, Nigerian Anglican prelate, bishop of Lagos (since 2018).
Willy Padrutt, 94, Swiss jurist.
Mike Potter, 73, American racing driver (NASCAR, CARS Tour).
Sharon Presley, 79, American feminist, writer, and activist.
Andrew Prine, 86, American actor (The Devil's Brigade, Chisum, V).
Vage Shakhverdyan, 77, Armenian stage director and politician, MP (1995–1999).
Keith Taylor, 69, British politician, MEP (2010–2019).
Alan Thomson, 76, Australian cricketer (Victoria, national team).
Adam Zimmer, 38, American football coach (New Orleans Saints, Cincinnati Bengals, Minnesota Vikings), chronic ethanol use disorder.

References

2022-10
10